Gurajada Kalakshetram is a cultural center and auditorium  in Visakhapatnam in the Indian state of Andhra Pradesh.

History
In 1986 Gurajada Kalakshetram is set up with 3,000 capacity. After renovation in 2018 the capacity of this auditorium is set up with 2,300.

About
this auditorium total capacity is 2,300 and area is 3000 square meters, and total project cost is ₹ 
980 lakhs. there are many musical, cultural film and other events are conducted in this auditorium.

References

Convention centres in India
Buildings and structures in Visakhapatnam
Theatres in India